Following torrential rainfall, a landslide was triggered which swept through the Izusan neighbourhood of Atami, Shizuoka Prefecture, Japan on 3 July 2021. 27 people died during the landslide and three injured. The city received  of rainfall in a 48-hour period, which prompted authorities to warn residents of "life threatening" conditions. The landslide destroyed a number of houses and left roads covered with debris. Search and rescue operations were underway as of 3 July, with local authorities reporting that they had received approximately ten phone calls from people trapped in their houses.

Background 
Situated on the edge of the prefecture's mountain ranges, it is known for its steep valleys and hills. In the latter half of the 20th century, the city saw growth as a resort town, with development continuing inland.

One of Japan's defining characteristics in terms of weather is its rainy season in early summer, which spans from late May to early July. Prior to the landslide, there had been several days of continuous torrential rainfall in the vicinity of Atami.

Investigation 
Investigations into the cause of the landslide are ongoing. Authorities are investigating suggestions by experts that improperly accumulated soil brought in for development purposes may have been partially responsible for the landslide.

References

External links
Information about heavy rain from July 1, 2021, Geospatial Information Authority of Japan

2021 meteorology
2021 disasters in Japan
Atami, Shizuoka
July 2021 events in Japan
Landslides in 2021
Landslides in Japan
2021 in Japan